Valley Union High School is a high school in Elfrida, Arizona. It is the only school in the Valley Union High School District.

References

Public high schools in Arizona
Schools in Cochise County, Arizona